Log Cabin Camp is an unincorporated community in Momence Township, Kankakee County, Illinois, United States.

References

Unincorporated communities in Illinois
Unincorporated communities in Kankakee County, Illinois